The 1974 New Mexico Lobos football team was an American football team that represented the University of New Mexico in the Western Athletic Conference (WAC) during the 1974 NCAA Division I football season.  In their first season under head coach Bill Mondt, the Lobos compiled a 4–6–1 record (3–4 against WAC opponents) and were outscored by a total of 263 to 192. 

The team's statistical leaders included Steve Myer with 1,103 passing yards, Floyd Perry with 294 rushing yards, and Ken Lege with 249 receiving yards and 36 points scored.

Schedule

References

New Mexico
New Mexico Lobos football seasons
New Mexico Lobos football